Twisted Black (born Tommy Burns, October 18, 1976) is a rapper from Detroit, Michigan and settled in Fort Worth, Texas as a teen. He is on the 3R Entertainment/Scarred 4 Life Records label, and has also gone under the pseudonym "145". His debut album with the duo One Gud Cide, Look What The Streets Made, sold 10,000 copies in less than 30 days. In 1998, he was incarcerated for a period of time. 
In September 2000 his first and only daughter Alisha was born. His daughter Mother Shameka Meeks of Fort Worth, Texas.
In July 2006, Twisted Black was arrested and charged by officers with the Drug Enforcement Administration in Midland, Texas, shortly after signing a deal with New York-based independent record label TVT Records. His TVT debut album, Street Fame, was released on March 6, 2007. Due out on the album release date is a DVD titled The Rise Of Twisted Black which was released through Twisted Black's own imprint Scarred For Life.

On February 22, 2007, he was sentenced to 30 years in prison on Federal drug charges. On May 2, 2008, he won an appeal for a re-sentencing due to changes in sentencing guidelines regarding crack cocaine.

Discography

Albums
1995: One Gud Cide - Look What The Streets Made
1997: One Gud Cide - Contradictions
2003: Late Bloomer
2005: The Life of Tommy Burns
2005: The Life of Tommy Burns (Swishahouse Remix)
2007: Street Fame
2010: Hustle or go broke vol,5 fed story
2011: Hustle or go broke fed radio
2019: [Bought Sense: The soundtrack]

Mixtapes
2002: Da Official Mixtape
2005: Black Out Part 1
2006: Hustle or Go Broke Volume I2006: Hustle or Go Broke Volume II2006: Hustle or Go Broke Volume III2007: Hustle or Go Broke Volume IV2011: Hustle or go broke fed radio''

Singles
2006: "I'm A Fool With It"
2016:"Mom Dead so should I Die"

References

External links
Chronic Magazine Interview

1976 births
African-American male rappers
American prisoners and detainees
Living people
People from Fort Worth, Texas
Prisoners and detainees of the United States federal government
Rappers from Texas
Southern hip hop musicians
TVT Records artists
Gangsta rappers
21st-century American rappers
21st-century American male musicians
American people convicted of drug offenses
21st-century African-American musicians
20th-century African-American people